Sidney Neil Brailsford, Lord Brailsford (born 15 August 1954) is a Senator of the College of Justice, a judge of Scotland’s Supreme Courts.

Early life
Brailsford was educated at Daniel Stewart's College, Edinburgh, and studied at the University of Stirling (B.A.) and the School of Law of the University of Edinburgh (LL.B.). He was called to the Bar in 1981.

Legal career
Brailsford's initial practice at the Bar was mostly in the civil courts, later developing a specialism in insurance. He was appointed Queen's Counsel in 1994, and an Advocate Depute in 1999, serving until 2000, at which time he was elected Treasurer of the Faculty, holding that position for one year. He was appointed a judge of the Court of Session and High Court of Justiciary, Scotland's Supreme Courts, in 2006. His appointment filled the vacancy created by Lord Hamilton's appointment as Lord President. He sits in the outer house. On 27th October 2022 it was announced that Lord Brailsford would chair the public inquiry into the Scottish Government's response to the Covid 19 pandemic

See also
List of Senators of the College of Justice

References

1954 births
Living people
Alumni of the University of Stirling
Alumni of the University of Edinburgh
Members of the Faculty of Advocates
People educated at Stewart's Melville College
Scottish King's Counsel
20th-century King's Counsel
Brailsford